Harry Lee Anstead (born November 4, 1937) was a justice of the Florida Supreme Court from 1994 to January 5, 2009, and he served as chief justice from July 1, 2002 until June 30, 2004. Prior to his appointment to the Florida Supreme Court by Governor Lawton Chiles, Anstead served as a judge on Florida's Fourth District Court of Appeals from 1977 to 1994.

His administration as Chief Justice was most noted for its successful implementation of "Revision 7," a constitutional amendment requiring the Florida Legislature to assume most of the cost of local state trial courts.  Previously, Florida county governments had paid a major portion of that cost. Implementation require two years of coordination between the Chief Justice and the legislature as about 1,500 employees who previously worked for county governments were transferred onto the Florida state courts' system payroll effective July 1, 2004.

Anstead attended the University of Florida as an undergraduate and received his law degree from the University of Florida's College of Law.

References

External links
Florida Supreme Court page on Harry Lee Anstead

University of Florida alumni
Anstead, Harry Lee
1937 births
Living people
People from Jacksonville, Florida
Justices of the Florida Supreme Court
Fredric G. Levin College of Law alumni